Conus marileeae is a species of sea snails, a marine gastropod mollusc in the family Conidae, the cone snails and their allies.

Like all species within the genus Conus, these snails are predatory and venomous. They are capable of "stinging" humans, therefore live ones should be handled carefully or not at all.

Distribution
This species occurs in the Caribbean Sea off Curaçao.

Description 
The size of the shell attains 20 mm.

References

  Harasewych, M. G. (2014). Attenuiconus marileeae, a new species of cone (Gastropoda: Conidae: Puncticulinae) from Curaçao. The Nautilus. 128(2): 55–58 
  Puillandre N., Duda T.F., Meyer C., Olivera B.M. & Bouchet P. (2015). One, four or 100 genera? A new classification of the cone snails. Journal of Molluscan Studies. 81: 1–23

External links
 

marileeae
Gastropods described in 2014